Skåre (or the historic spelling Skaare) may refer to:

Places
Skåre, Norway, a former municipality in Rogaland county, Norway
Skåre Church, a church in the town of Haugesund in Rogaland county, Norway
Skåre, Sweden, a town in Karlstad Municipality, Värmland County, Sweden

People
Arne Skaare (1907–1981), a Norwegian politician for the Conservative Party
Bjørn Skaare (1958–1989), a Norwegian ice hockey player
Jan Skåre (1929–2018), a Norwegian judge
Mats Lie Skåre, a Norwegian songwriter and music producer
Snøfrid Skaare (born 1939), a Norwegian politician for the Conservative Party

See also
Skare, a village in Odda municipality, Hordaland county, Norway
Skaar (disambiguation)